Goia may refer to:

 A village in Ungheni Commune, Argeș County, Romania

Romanian surname 

 Ancuța Goia (b. 1976), Romanian rhythmic gymnast
 Cosmin Goia (b. 1982), Romanian football defender and manager

See also 
 Goya (disambiguation)
 Goiás (disambiguation)

Romanian-language surnames